Sine Ergün (born 1982) is a Turkish writer. She has published three books till date. Her second book Bazen Hayat won the Sait Faik Short Story Award, while her third book Baştankara won the EU Prize for Literature. She has edited Notos magazine, and is the founding director of the art initiative Maumau.

Books
 Burası Tekin Değil (It's not Safe Here, Yitik Ülke Publishing, 2010; Can Publishing, 2012), 
 Bazen Hayat (Life, Sometimes, Can Publishing, 2012) and 
 Baştankara (Titmouse, Can Publishing, 2016).

References

21st-century Turkish women writers
1982 births
Living people